Bøylestad is a village in Froland municipality in Agder county, Norway. The population of Bøylestad (2001) was 214.

The village has a railway station, Bøylestad Station, a part of the Arendalsbanen railway line.

References

Villages in Agder
Froland